Neope bhadra is a nymphalid butterfly known from Asia, where it is found from Sikkim to Upper Burma.

Subspecies
Neope bhadra bhadra
Neope bhadra subflava Zhou, 1994 (Guangxi)

References

Elymniini
Butterflies of Asia
Butterflies of Indochina